"Hjärta" (Swedish for Heart) is a song by the Swedish alternative rock band Kent. It was released as the second single from the band's eight studio album, Röd, on 21 December 2009 as digital download. The single contains the album version of "Hjärta" including two additional remixes.

Track listing

Charts

References

Kent (band) songs
2009 singles
Song recordings produced by Joshua (record producer)
Songs written by Joakim Berg
Songs written by Martin Sköld
2009 songs